Pekka Antero Vasala (born 17 April 1948) is a retired Finnish middle-distance athlete who won an Olympic gold medal in the 1972 Summer Olympics in Munich.

At the 1968 Summer Olympics in Mexico City he failed to advance from the first round of heats in the 1500 m.

In Munich he won the 1500 m race in a time of 3 minutes 36.3 seconds, ahead of Kip Keino and Rod Dixon. His countryman Lasse Virén had won the 5,000 m earlier in the day, in addition to winning the 10,000 m in world record time earlier in the games.  With a medal in every track event from 1500 to 10,000 meters, three gold and one bronze (Tapio Kantanen in the 3000 meter steeplechase) Finnish athletes achieved a level of success not seen since the era of the "Flying Finns" (1912–1936).

His nephew, Samuli Vasala, also an athlete, won the 2003 Nordic Cross Country Championships. Vasala is the son-in-law of Martti Matilainen.

References

External links

1948 births
Living people
People from Riihimäki
Finnish male middle-distance runners
Finnish male steeplechase runners
Olympic athletes of Finland
Olympic gold medalists for Finland
Medalists at the 1972 Summer Olympics
Athletes (track and field) at the 1968 Summer Olympics
Athletes (track and field) at the 1972 Summer Olympics
Olympic gold medalists in athletics (track and field)
Sportspeople from Kanta-Häme